Tserenbaltavyn Sarantuyaa (born 1959) is a Mongolian social scientist, lawyer, writer and an expert of Constitutional law. She received the Order of Merit of the Federal Republic of Germany in 2013.

Biography
Born in the Mongolian capital Ulan Bator in 1959, Sarantuyaa received her degree in law from the Russian Voronezh State University in 1981. She went to Germany to do her doctorate from Martin Luther University of Halle-Wittenberg (1987). The same year she became a professor of law at the Legal Institute of National University of Mongolia with specialisation in Constitutional law and Constitutional procedure.

Since 1992, Sarantuyaa has been a project manager for the Mongolian branch of Hanns Seidel Foundation. From 1998 to 2001, she acted as an arbitrator for the Mongolian Chamber of Commerce. She was appointed a member of the Constitutional Commission of Mongolia in June 2001 and after receiving an extension in November 2007 served in that capacity till 2013. In recognition of her work in the field of law, she was awarded the Order of Merit of the Federal Republic of Germany in April 2013.

References

1959 births
Living people
People from Ulaanbaatar
Mongolian lawyers
Mongolian social scientists
Martin Luther University of Halle-Wittenberg alumni
Officers Crosses of the Order of Merit of the Federal Republic of Germany
Academic staff of the National University of Mongolia
Voronezh State University alumni